Events from the year 1561 in Sweden

Incumbents
 Monarch – Eric XIV

Events

 1 March - Inauguration of the Kullen Lighthouse.
 14 April - The Arboga artiklar regulates the power within the Swedish duchies, limiting the political power of the King's brothers. 
 May - The King creates the Höga nämnden, a private court of the King. 
 June - Swedish Estonia is created. 
 29 June - Coronation of Eric XIV. The hereditary titles friherre (Baron) and count are introduced in Sweden.
 - Swedish patrol boats patrols the Östersjön to protect ships from pirates. 
 - A law on inns are proclaimed in which the hosts are instructed to keep sufficient supply for humans and horses and the prices are regulated.

Births

 - Lucretia Gyllenhielm, illegitimate royal daughter  (died 1585)

Deaths

References

 
Years of the 16th century in Sweden
Sweden